Taiwanese kana (Pe̍h-ōe-jī : "tâi oân gí ká biêng", IPA) is a katakana-based writing system that was used to write Taiwanese Hokkien (commonly called "Taiwanese") when the island of Taiwan was under Japanese rule. It functioned as a phonetic guide to hanzi, much like furigana in Japanese or Zhuyin fuhao in Chinese. There were similar systems for other languages in Taiwan as well, including Hakka and Formosan languages.

The system was imposed by Japan at the time and used in a few dictionaries, as well as textbooks. The Taiwanese–Japanese Dictionary, published in 1931–32, is an example. It uses various signs and diacritics to identify sounds that do not exist in Japanese. The system is chiefly based on the Amoy dialect of Hokkien.

Through the system, the Office of the Governor-General of Taiwan aimed to help Taiwanese people learn the Japanese language, as well as help Japanese people learn the Taiwanese language. Linguistically speaking, however, the syllabary system was cumbersome for a language that has phonology far more complicated than Japanese. After Japanese administration ended, the system soon became obsolete. Now, only a few scholars, such as those who study the aforementioned dictionary, learn Taiwanese kana.

The system has undergone some modification over time. This article is mainly about the last edition, used from roughly 1931.

Basic rules
Each syllable is written with two or three kana (with a few exceptions). Notable differences include:

Vowels
 In syllables with a single vowel, the kana for the vowel is repeated, like the long vowels in Japanese. For example,  .
They are used to represent the second vowel in the middle of a syllable, or a final glottal stop.
For example,  .

Consonants
  is pronounced , not  as in Japanese.
 There are five overlined kana to distinguish  and /.
{|class=wikitable
!rowspan=2| !!colspan=5 width=225|Taiwanese kana !!colspan=5 width=225|Modern Japanese kana
|-
!  !!  !!  !!  !!  !!  !!  !! !!  !! 
|-align=center
!
|||
|||||
|||||||||
|-align=center
!/
|||||
|
|
|||||||||
|}
Note that ,  are pronounced ,  when they are used as initials.
 The syllabic consonant  is spelt (u+), for example  [kŋ̍].
 The syllabic consonant  is spelt (u+), for example  .
For example,  .
 Final glottal stops  are represented by the short-vowel small kana at the end. For example,  .

Tone signs
There are different tone signs for normal vowels and nasal vowels.
{| class=wikitable
!Tone number !!width=50| 1 !!width=50| 2(6) !!width=50| 3 !!width=50| 4 !!width=50| 5 !!width=50| 7 !!width=50| 8
|-align=center
|Pitch||||||||||||||
|-align=center
| Normal vowels || None ||  ||  ||  ||  ||  || 
|-align=center
| Nasal vowels ||  ||  ||  ||  ||  ||  || 
|-align=center
| Pe̍h-ōe-jī || a || á || à || ah || â || ā || a̍h
|}
 When a text is written vertically, these signs are written on the right side of letters. Taiwanese kana is only attested in vertical orientation, so it is unknown where the signs would be placed if it were written horizontally.
Note that  and  share the same initial kana.

Taiwanese kana chart

Rime chart

Syllable chart

 Tone signs are always needed for a syllable.

Example

Unicode support

Amongst software/encodings, Mojikyo fully supports the system.

Unicode has been able to represent small ku and small pu since Unicode 3.2, small katakana wo since Unicode 12.0, and tone signs since Unicode 14.0 (2021).

It also requires the use of the combining overline and combining dot below with kana to represent overlined and underdotted kana. Font support for these small kana and for sensible rendering of these uncommon combining sequences is in practice limited; overlines and less well-supported small kana are simulated in the tables below using markup.

References

Further reading

 
Lîm, Chùn-io̍k. (2008). 《台日大辭典》索引羅馬字對照表.

Taiwan under Japanese rule
Kana
Transcription of Chinese
Hokkien writing system
Writing systems introduced in the 19th century
1896 introductions
1896 in Taiwan
1945 disestablishments in Taiwan